Abdul Wahhab is a male Muslim given name, and in modern usage, surname. It is built from the Arabic words ʻabd and al-Wahhāb, one of the names of God in the Qur'an, which give rise to the Muslim theophoric names. It means "servant of the all-giver".

The letter a of the al- is unstressed, and can be transliterated by almost any vowel, often by u. The last element may appear as Wahab, Wahhab, Vehhab, Ouahab, and others with the whole name subject to variable spacing and hyphenation.

It may refer to:

Abd al-Wahhab ibn Rustam (784-832), the founder of the Wahhabism Ibadi Movement, in Tiaret, in Algeria
Qadi 'Abd al-Wahhab (973–1031), Iraqi Maliki scholar and jurist
ʿAbd al-Wahhāb ibn Aḥmad aš-Šaʿrānī, known as just Shaʿrānī (1492–1565), Egyptian Sufi teacher
Mohammed ibn abd al-Wahab al-Ghassani (died 1707), Moroccan diplomat and travel writer
Muhammad ibn Abd Al-Wahhab (1702-1792), Arab Hanbali scholar, founder of modern Wahhabism
Abdul Wahab, known as Sachal Sarmast (1739–1829), Sindhi Sufi poet
Abdulvehhab Ilhamija (1773–1821), Bosnian Dervish  and writer
Kheireddine Abdul Wahab (1878–1944), Lebanese businessman
Bachir Abdelouahab (1897–1978), Algerian politician and medical doctor
Abdul Wahab Khan Tarzi (born 1903), Afghan civil servant
Mohammed Abdel Wahab (1902 –1991), Egyptian singer and composer
Abdul-Wahab Mirjan (1909–1964), Iraqi politician
Khaled Abdul-Wahab (1911–1997), Tunisian who helped Jews in World War II
Fatin Abdel Wahab (1913–1972), Egyptian film director
Abdolvahaab Shahidi (born 1914), Iranian singer and barbat player
Abd al-Wahhab Hawmad (1915-2002), Syrian politician
Afif Abdul Wahab (1915–2003), Lebanese doctor
Abd al-Wahab al-Shawaf (1916-1959), Iraqi revolutionary
Abdul Wahab (journalist) (1916 – 1994), Bangladeshi journalist
Shah Abd al-Wahhab (1894—1982), Bangladeshi Islamic scholar and former principal of Darul Uloom Hathazari
Abdul Wahhab Pirji (1890–1976), Bangladeshi Islamic scholar
Muhammad Abdulwahhab (born 1923), Indian Muslim religious teacher
Abd al-Wahhab Al-Bayati (1926–1999), Iraqi poet
Abdel Wahab Elmessiri (1938–2008), Egyptian political philosopher
Abdul Wahab Adam (1938-2014), Ghanaian Muslim Scholar and Ameer of the Ahmadiyya movement, Ghana
Abdelwahab Abdallah (born 1940), Tunisian politician
Abdul Wahab Siddiqi (1942–1994), Pakistani religious scholar and Sufi Master
Abdulwahab Darawshe (born 1943), Arab-Israeli politician
Tuan Haji Anuar bin Haji Abd. Wahab (1945–2009), Malaysian silat expert
Abdelwahab Meddeb (born 1946), Tunisian-French poet and essayist
Mounes Abdul Wahab (born 1947), Lebanese blind civil rights activist, author and pioneer of disabled rights movement
AbdulWahab Raweh (born 1952), Yemeni politician
Mohamed Abdelwahab Abdelfattah (born 1962), Egyptian classical composer
Abdul-Wahab Abu Al-Hail (born 1976), Iraqi footballer
Musa Abed Al Wahab (born 1977), Saudi held in Guantanamo
AbdulWahab al-Awdi (born 1978), Yemeni poet
Mohamed Abdelwahab (1983–2006), Egyptian footballer
Abdul Wahab Khan (politician), speaker of the National Assembly of Pakistan
Abdul Wahab Peevee (P. V. Abdul Wahab), Indian politician
Zamzani Abdul Wahab (Chef Zam), Malaysian chef
Abdul Wahab Dar, Pakistani cricketer
Abdul Wahab (educationist), Pakistani educationist
As a female name, it may refer to:
Sherine Abdel Wahhab (born 1980), Egyptian singer

See also
 Aboab family

References

Arabic masculine given names
Iranian masculine given names